In celestial mechanics, the specific relative angular momentum (often denoted  or ) of a body is the angular momentum of that body divided by its mass. In the case of two orbiting bodies it is the vector product of their relative position and relative linear momentum, divided by the mass of the body in question.

Specific relative angular momentum plays a pivotal role in the analysis of the two-body problem, as it remains constant for a given orbit under ideal conditions. "Specific" in this context indicates angular momentum per unit mass. The SI unit for specific relative angular momentum is square meter per second.

Definition 
The specific relative angular momentum is defined as the cross product of the relative position vector  and the relative velocity vector .

The  vector is always perpendicular to the instantaneous osculating orbital plane, which coincides with the instantaneous perturbed orbit. It is not necessarily be perpendicular to the average orbital plane over time.

Proof of constancy in the two body case 

Under certain conditions, it can be proven that the specific angular momentum is constant. The conditions for this proof include:
 The mass of one object is much greater than the mass of the other one.
 The coordinate system is inertial.
 Each object can be treated as a spherically symmetrical point mass.
 No other forces act on the system other than the gravitational force that connects the two bodies.

Proof 

The proof starts with the two body equation of motion, derived from Newton's law of universal gravitation:

where:
(the acceleration)
  is the Gravitational constant.

The cross product of the position vector with the equation of motion is:

Because  the second term vanishes:

It can also be derived that:

Combining these two equations gives:

Since the time derivative is equal to zero, the quantity  is constant.
 is constant.

This is different from the normal construction of momentum, because it does not include the mass of the object in question.

Kepler's laws of planetary motion 

Kepler's laws of planetary motion can be proved almost directly with the above relationships.

First law 
The proof starts again with the equation of the two-body problem. This time one multiplies it (cross product) with the specific relative angular momentum

The left hand side is equal to the derivative  because the angular momentum is constant.

After some steps (which includes using the vector triple product and defining the scalar  to be the radial velocity, as opposed to the norm of the vector ) the right hand side becomes:

Setting these two expression equal and integrating over time leads to (with the constant of integration )

Finally one gets the orbit equation

which is the equation of a conic section in polar coordinates with semi-latus rectum  and eccentricity .

Second law 
The second law follows instantly from the second of the three equations to calculate the absolute value of the specific relative angular momentum.

If one connects this form of the equation  with the relationship  for the area of a sector with an infinitesimal small angle  (triangle with one very small side), the equation

Third law 
Kepler's third is a direct consequence of the second law. Integrating over one revolution gives the orbital period

for the area  of an ellipse.

There is thus a relationship between the semi-major axis and the orbital period of a satellite that can be reduced to a constant of the central body.

See also 
 Specific orbital energy, another conserved quantity in the two-body problem.

References

Angular momentum
Astrodynamics
Orbits